Clanton is a city in Chilton County, Alabama, United States. It is part of the Birmingham–Hoover–Cullman Combined Statistical Area. The city is the county seat of Chilton County. Clanton is near the site of the geographic center of the U.S. state of Alabama.

History
The area that would become Clanton was known as "Goose Pond" and nearby "Ranch" when Baker County (later renamed Chilton County) was founded on December 30, 1868. Soon thereafter (May 1871) the town of Clanton took its name from the South and North Alabama Railroad station of that name. A couple of actions solidified the name of the town. First, during the Alabama Legislative actions to allow the vote to set the permanent location of the courthouse (January - March 1871), their amendments changed the nominated name from "Baker's" to "Clanton."  Finalizing the name change was an official application in May 1871 by the Postmaster to the Federal Postal System to re-designate the local Post Office as "Clanton" and terminate the former designation (Goose Pond). The railroad had named "Clanton Station" in honor of James H. Clanton, an attorney, Chairman of the Alabama Democratic Executive committee, and a former Brigadier General in the Confederate States Army. It was incorporated on April 23, 1873. Alfred Baker was also elected first mayor of the town.

Nearby Mitchell Dam became Alabama Power's first two dams in the state, bringing economic improvements to the area. Immigrants played a part in starting the county's peach industry more than a century ago. Today, the peach industry is the number one industry in Chilton County, not only bringing fame to the county, but also millions of dollars to the local economy. The city of Clanton constructed a water tower in the form of a peach in 1993, becoming a landmark for travelers along Interstate 65.

Early civil rights activist Ida B. Wells reproduced a photographic postcard depicting an 1891 lynching in Clanton to educate the white public of the atrocities committed against blacks.

During World War II, a small German prisoner of war camp was located in Clanton in the former Civilian Conservation Corps (CCC) camp west of town.

Geography
Clanton is located southeast of the center of Chilton County at 32°50'23.316" North, 86°37'41.477" West (32.839810, -86.628188).

The city is located in the central part of the state along Interstate 65, which runs north to south to the east of the city, with access from exits 205, 208, and 212. Other highways that run through the city include U.S. Route 31, which runs north to south through
the center of the city, leading north  to Calera and south  to Prattville, and Alabama State Route 22, which leads east  to Rockford and west  to Maplesville.

Climate
The climate in this area is characterized by hot, humid summers and generally mild to cool winters. According to the Köppen Climate Classification system, Clanton has a humid subtropical climate, abbreviated Cfa on climate maps.

Demographics

2020 census

As of the 2020 United States census, there were 8,768 people, 3,423 households, and 1,989 families residing in the city.

2000 census
As of the census of 2000, there were 7,800 people, 3,168 households, and 2,128 families residing in the city. The racial makeup of the city was 46.31% White, 46.01% Black or African American, 1.29% Native American, 0.33% Asian, 0.01% Pacific Islander, 1.29% from other races, and 0.74% from two or more races. 2.64% of the population were Hispanic or Latino of any race.

There were 3,168 households, out of which 29.0% had children under the age of 18 living with them, 47.3% were married couples living together, 16.5% had a female householder with no husband present, and 32.8% were non-families. 29.9% of all households were made up of individuals, and 16.0% had someone living alone who was 65 years of age or older. The average household size was 2.37 and the average family size was 2.93.

In the city, the population was spread out, with 23.8% under the age of 18, 8.0% from 18 to 24, 27.2% from 25 to 44, 23.0% from 45 to 64, and 18.0% who were 65 years of age or older. The median age was 39 years. For every 100 females, there were 86.6 males. For every 100 females age 18 and over, there were 81.6 males.

The median income for a household in the city was $30,394, and the median income for a family was $37,568. Males had a median income of $32,484 versus $20,344 for females. The per capita income for the city was $15,299. About 15.1% of families and 19.5% of the population were below the poverty line, including 27.5% of those under age 18 and 14.0% of those age 65 or over.

Government
Clanton is governed via the mayor-council system. The mayor is elected in a citywide vote. The city council consists of five members elected from one of five wards.

Billy Joe Driver served as mayor for more than 35 years, from 1984 until July 9, 2020, when he died from COVID-19. He was 84 years old. He had planned to retire in January 2021.

Police corruption
Numerous cases of corruption have been associated with the Clanton Police Department as well as the Chilton County District and Circuit Courts.

David Michael Hegwood, a 22-year veteran of the Clanton Police Department, was arrested in August 2011 for stealing a sign from a local restaurant in uniform.

In 2014, David Lee Hubbard, a Chilton County Sheriff's deputy, was charged with multiple counts of sexual contact with underage girls.
The trial was moved to Prattville and in December 2015, Hubbard pleaded guilty to all counts

Clanton Police Chief Brian Stilwell, was arrested in April 2015, on charges relating to the misappropriation of funds from the Operation Santa Clause drive. The crimes he pleaded guilty to happened between 2010 and 2015 while Stilwell was the Clanton Police Chief and treasurer of the Chilton County Fraternal Order of Police (FOP). The former chief of the Clanton Police Department pleaded guilty on a violation of the ethics law and fraudulent use of a credit card.

Economy
Over 80% of Alabama's peach crop comes from Chilton County.  Perhaps Clanton's most recognizable landmark is its peach-shaped water tower, which celebrates the community's agricultural significance.

The City of Clanton has a jurisdiction of approximately 30 square miles and over 30,000 people travel through Clanton every day

One of the biggest events each year in Chilton County is the annual Peach Festival held in June. The festival, held in Clanton, crowns a new Peach Queen each year and also includes a Peach Parade and the Peach Jam Jubilee, a music concert and street fair.

Clanton has a 30-bed hospital with 24-hour emergency care.

Education
The Chilton County School System provides public education for Clanton. Students in Clanton may attend any public school in Chilton County.

High schools
Chilton County High School (Grades 9 through 12)
LeCroy Technical Center (Grades 10 through 12)

Middle school
Clanton Middle School (Grades 7 through 8)

Elementary schools
Clanton Intermediate School (Grades 4 through 6)
Clanton Elementary School (Grades K through 3)

College 
Jefferson State Community College - Chilton-Clanton Campus

Transportation

Chilton County Airport (FAA LID: 02A), also known as Gragg-Wade Field, is a public use airport in Chilton County, Alabama, United States. The airport is located one nautical mile (2 km) east of the central business district of Clanton, Alabama. It is owned by the Chilton County Airport Authority.

Media

Newspaper
The Clanton Advertiser (daily)
Chilton County News (weekly)

Radio
WKLF - Southern Gospel 95.5FM & 1000AM 5am to 5pm, 95.5 FM "The Peach" 5 Decades Of Rock and Roll Oldies (5os, 60s, 70s, 80s, & 90s) 5pm to 5am, wklfradio.com and thepeach.live online. 
WPJN - Praise 89.3FM, Contemporary Gospel

Culture and recreation

Clanton has hosted the annual Chilton County Peach Festival since 1952.

The Clanton Conference and Performing Arts Center (CCPAC) is a multi-purpose facility adjacent to the Jefferson State Community College–Clanton campus. The City of Clanton and Jefferson State Community College have worked closely to develop a state-of-the-art multi-purpose facility for trade shows, special events and conferences.

Clanton Parks & Rec:
 Clanton City Park & City Pool
 Corner Park
 E.M. Henry Skills Center & Pool
 Goosepond Park
 Ollie Park
 Clanton Recreation Center

Notable people
 Randall Atcheson, concert pianist
 James Bean, former member of the Mississippi State Senate
 Clay Carroll, Major League Baseball player
 Wesley Dennis, country music artist
 Amariah Farrow, former professional football player
 Jackie Hayes, major league baseball player
 Jackson W. Moore, former CEO of Union Planters Bank and Regions Financial Corporation
 Clarence H. Mullins, judge for the United States District Court for the Northern District of Alabama from 1943 to 1957
 Melinda Mullins, actress
 Jarrod Patterson, major league baseball player
 Mac Powell, lead singer for the Christian rock band Third Day
 Drew Roy, actor
 Grayson Russell, child actor

References

External links

City of Clanton official website 

Cities in Alabama
Cities in Chilton County, Alabama
County seats in Alabama
Populated places established in 1868
Birmingham metropolitan area, Alabama
1868 establishments in Alabama